Club Deportivo Manchego was a Spanish football team based in Ciudad Real in the namesake province, in the autonomous community of Castile-La Mancha. Founded in 1929 and dissolved in 2000, Its successor was Manchego CF and later CD Ciudad Real, that was renamed again as Manchego in 2016.

Season to season

Grounds
Campo de la Puerta de Granada (1929–1939)
Campo del Regimiento de Artillería (1939–1943)
Campo de la Puerta de Granada (1943–1947)
Campo de la Puerta de Santa María (1947–1971)
Estadio Rey Juan Carlos I (1971–2000)

External links
Lafutbolteca team profile
Futbolme team profile 

Defunct football clubs in Castilla–La Mancha
Association football clubs established in 1929
Association football clubs disestablished in 2000
1929 establishments in Spain
2000 disestablishments in Spain
Sport in Ciudad Real